Chlorophlaeoba is a genus of grasshoppers in the family Acrididae, subfamily Acridinae. Species can be found in southern China and Indo-China.

The genus was formally described by German entomologist Willy Ramme in 1940. It was placed in the tribe Phlaeobini in a 2014 checklist of Vietnamese Orthoptera; the holotype is a male C. tonkinensis tonkinensis from Vietnam.

Chlorophlaeoba is similar to the genus Phlaeoba. In contrast with Phlaeoba, the head of Chlorophlaeoba substantially pointed, as long or longer than the pronotum, and the name suggests that species have an olive green colouration.

Species
The Orthoptera Species File lists six species and two subspecies:
Chlorophlaeoba hongkongensis Zheng & Li, 2012
Chlorophlaeoba longiceps Liang & Zheng, 1988
Chlorophlaeoba longusala Zheng, 1982 – sometimes considered a synonym of C. tonkinensis
Chlorophlaeoba nigripennis Zheng, Lin, Xu & Ma, 2013
Chlorophlaeoba taiwanensis Yin, Li & Yin, 2007
Chlorophlaeoba tonkinensis Ramme, 1941
Chlorophlaeoba tonkinensis tonkinensis Ramme, 1941Chlorophlaeoba tonkinensis siamensis'' Ingrisch, 1989

References

External links

Acridinae
Acrididae genera
Orthoptera of Asia